Harlan Orville "Pat" Page (March 20, 1887 – November 23, 1965) was an American football, basketball, and baseball player and coach. He was one of basketball's first star players in the early 1900s. The 5'9" Chicago native played guard at the University of Chicago (1906–1910) and was known as a defensive specialist. While leading Chicago to three national championships (1908–1910), the Helms Athletic Foundation retroactively named him an All-American each time and named National Player of the Year in 1910. Page also played football at Chicago. Walter Camp selected him as a second-team All-American at the end in 1908 and a third-team All-American at the same position in 1909.

Following his playing days, Page embarked on a coaching career. He served as the head basketball coach at the University of Chicago (1911–1920), Butler University (1920–1925) and the College of Idaho (1936–1938), compiling a career college basketball record of 269–140. In 1924, he coached Butler to the AAU title. Page was also the head football coach at Butler from 1920 to 1925, at Indiana University from 1926 to 1930 and at Albertson College (now known as the College of Idaho) from 1936 to 1937, tallying a career college football mark of 58–46–7. In addition, Page coached baseball at the University of Chicago from 1913 to 1920 and again in 1931, amassing a record of 63–35.  In 1962, he was enshrined in the Naismith Memorial Basketball Hall of Fame as a player.

Head coaching record

Football

Basketball

References

External links
 
 

1887 births
1965 deaths
All-American college men's basketball players
American football ends
American men's basketball coaches
American men's basketball players
Basketball coaches from Michigan
Basketball coaches from Illinois
Basketball players from Michigan
Basketball players from Chicago
Butler Bulldogs athletic directors
Butler Bulldogs football coaches
Butler Bulldogs men's basketball coaches
Chicago Maroons baseball coaches
Chicago Maroons baseball players
Chicago Maroons football coaches
Chicago Maroons football players
Chicago Maroons men's basketball coaches
Chicago Maroons men's basketball players
College of Idaho Coyotes athletic directors
College of Idaho Coyotes football coaches
College of Idaho Coyotes men's basketball coaches
Guards (basketball)
Indiana Hoosiers football coaches
Naismith Memorial Basketball Hall of Fame inductees
National Collegiate Basketball Hall of Fame inductees
Players of American football from Michigan
Players of American football from Chicago
Sportspeople from Chicago